The fifth season of the American legal comedy-drama Suits was ordered on August 11, 2014. The fifth season originally aired on USA Network in the United States between June 24, 2015 and March 2, 2016. The season was produced by Hypnotic Films & Television and Universal Cable Productions, and the executive producers were Doug Liman, David Bartis and series creator Aaron Korsh. The season had six series regulars playing employees at the fictional Pearson Specter Litt law firm in Manhattan: Gabriel Macht, Patrick J. Adams, Rick Hoffman, Meghan Markle, Sarah Rafferty, and Gina Torres

Overview
The series revolves around corporate lawyer Harvey Specter and his associate attorney Mike Ross, the latter practicing without a law degree.

Cast

Regular cast
 Gabriel Macht as Harvey Specter
 Patrick J. Adams as Mike Ross
 Rick Hoffman as Louis Litt
 Meghan Markle as Rachel Zane
 Sarah Rafferty as Donna Paulsen
 Gina Torres as Jessica Pearson

Special Guest Cast
 David Costabile as Daniel Hardman

Recurring Cast
 Wendell Pierce as Robert Zane
 Eric Roberts as Charles Forstman
 Amanda Schull as Katrina Bennett
 Rachael Harris as Sheila Sazs
 Leslie Hope as Anita Gibbs
 John Pyper-Ferguson as Jack Soloff
 Farid Yazdani as David Green
 Christina Cole as Dr. Paula Agard

Guest Cast
 Megan Gallagher as Laura Zane
Six actors received star billing in the show's first season. Each character works at the fictional Pearson Specter Litt law firm in Manhattan.  Gabriel Macht plays corporate lawyer Harvey Specter, who is promoted to senior partner and is forced to hire an associate attorney. Patrick J. Adams plays college dropout Mike Ross, who wins the associate position with his eidetic memory and genuine desire to be a good lawyer. Rick Hoffman plays Louis Litt, Harvey's jealous rival and the direct supervisor of the firm's first-year associates. Meghan Markle plays Rachel Zane, a paralegal who aspires to be an attorney but her test anxiety prevents her from attending Harvard Law School. Sarah Rafferty plays Donna Paulsen, Harvey's long-time legal secretary and confidant. Gina Torres plays Jessica Pearson, the co-founder and managing partner of the firm.

Episodes

Ratings

References

External links 
Suits episodes at USA Network
List of Suits season 1 episodes at Internet Movie Database

05
2015 American television seasons
2016 American television seasons